Rockets Rockets Rockets (stylized as ROCKETSROCKETSROCKETS) is a game created by Radial Games and was released in 2015. The game was released for Microsoft Windows, macOS, Linux, PlayStation 4, and Nintendo Switch.

Gameplay
Rockets Rockets Rockets is set in a 2D world where the player controls a rocket while attacking and being attacked by AI and human controlled enemies. The aim of the game is to try to get a three point lead against your enemy. The game contains power-ups and different environments.

References

2015 video games
Linux games
MacOS games
Multiplayer and single-player video games
Nintendo Switch games
PlayStation 4 games
Radial Games games
Strategy video games
Video games developed in Canada
Windows games